Layang-Layangan is a small town in Federal Territory of Labuan, Malaysia. One of famous features is Surrender Point and Labuan Peace Park.

Labuan